Carlo Biado (born October 31, 1983) is a Filipino professional pool player.

Early life
Biado has roots in Rosario, La Union and/or Nueva Ecija. He started playing pool when he was age 13 and worked as a caddie at the Villamor Air Base golf course while he was still a student. After work he would play billiards in the evening. He stopped pursuing high school education when he was on his first year and the sport serves as a means of livelihood. He earned money from bets in the billiards place he helps manage.

Career
Biado became a professional pool player in 2004 but failed to win any major world title within his first ten years. In 2015, Biado reached the final of the WPA World Ten-ball Championship, defeating David Alcaide and Nikos Ekonomopoulos in the knockout rounds. Biado would eventually lose the final to Taiwan's Ko Pin-yi 9–11.

In 2017, Biado defeated Jayson Shaw of the UK, 11–7, to win the men's 9-ball event of the 2017 World Games.

Also in 2017, Biado defeated countryman Roland Garcia, 13–5, to win the 2017 WPA World Nine-ball Championship. The following year, Biado would also reach the final of the 2018 event, however, would lose 10–13 to Joshua Filler.

Biado reached the final of the 2019 WPA Players Championship, losing to Kevin Cheng 12–11.

A month after, Biado and De Luna booked a spot in the final of 2019 World Cup of Pool by beating the Netherlands duo of Neils Feijen and Marc Bijsterbosch, 9–6 in the semifinal but eventually fell short in the finals against Austria, yielding an 11-3 decision.

The tandem of Carlo Biado and Jeff de Luna was unable to clinch the country's fourth title against the team of Mario He and Albin Ouschan which bagged their second title in their third consecutive finals appearance.

2021, Biado defeated Aloysius Yapp, 13–8, to win the U.S. Open Pool Championship. With the win, Biado became one of the few Filipino players to win the tournament along with Alex Pagulayan and Efren Reyes.

Titles and achievements
 2023 Manny Pacquiao 10-Ball Championship
 2022 Pro Billiard Series Puerto Rico Open 
 2022 WPA World Mixed Teams 10-Ball Championship
 2022 CSI U.S. Open 8-Ball Championship
 2021 Southeast Asian Games Ten-ball Singles
 2021 Abu Dhabi Open 9-Ball Championship
 2021 U.S. Open 9-Ball Championship
 2020 Predator One Pool 10-Ball
 2018 Philippines vs. Chinese Taipei Challenge Match
 2018 Jogja Open International 10-Ball
 2017 Philippine Sportsman of the Year
 2017 WPA World Nine-ball Championship
 2017 World Games Nine-ball Singles 
 2017 Southeast Asian Games Nine-ball Singles
 2015 Japan Open 10-Ball
 2015 Southeast Asian Games Nine-ball Doubles
 2013 Hard Times 10-Ball Open
 2012 Green Garden Jakarta 9-Ball Open
 2012 Banjamasin 9-Ball Championship
 2011 Philippine National Championship
 2010 Manny Pacquiao 10-Ball Championship

References

1983 births
Living people
Competitors at the 2017 World Games
Filipino pool players
People from La Union
Southeast Asian Games gold medalists for the Philippines
Southeast Asian Games competitors for the Philippines
Southeast Asian Games silver medalists for the Philippines
Southeast Asian Games bronze medalists for the Philippines
Southeast Asian Games medalists in cue sports
World Games gold medalists
World champions in pool
WPA World Nine-ball Champions
Competitors at the 2013 Southeast Asian Games
Competitors at the 2015 Southeast Asian Games
Competitors at the 2017 Southeast Asian Games
Competitors at the 2019 Southeast Asian Games
People from Nueva Ecija
Competitors at the 2021 Southeast Asian Games